XMX may refer to:
 xmx, a block cipher
 XMX (XM), a satellite radio station
 Maden language, an Austronesian language of West Papua